Events from the year 1787 in Sweden

Incumbents
 Monarch – Gustav III

Events
 24 January – Hamlet is played for the first time in Sweden by Andreas Widerberg at the Comediehuset in Gothenburg. 
 A private Swedish language theater are founded in Bollhuset in Stockholm by Adolf Fredrik Ristell.
 The Royal Dramatic Training Academy is founded.
 The art of circus is introduced for the first time in Sweden through the Price Circus Company of Rosalia Price, Peter Price (1761-1790) and James Price (1761-1805), who tour Sweden.

Births
 22 February – Erik Djurström, stage actor (died 1841)
 26 April – Elisabet Charlotta Piper, court official (died 1860)
 4 December – Johan Fredrik Berwald, violinist, conductor and composer  (died 1861)
 Catharina Torenberg, violinist  (died 1866)

Deaths

 Agatha Lovisa de la Myle, poet (born 1724)

References

 
Years of the 18th century in Sweden
Sweden